Mariana Pineda is a play by the Spanish playwright and poet Federico García Lorca. It is based on the life of Mariana de Pineda Muñoz, whose opposition to Ferdinand VII (and subsequent public execution  in  1831 for treason),  had become part of the folklore of Granada. The play was written between 1923 and 1925 and was first performed in June 1927 at the Teatre Goya in Barcelona. That production was directed by García Lorca, with scenic design and costumes by Salvador Dalí, and was performed by the company of Margarida Xirgu. The play received its Madrid première that October, at the Teatro Fontalba.

In contrast to García Lorca's first play, The Butterfly's Evil Spell, which was first performed in 1920 but which closed after only four performances, Mariana Pineda was a success. Consequently, García Lorca often claimed that Mariana Pineda was his first play.

The play figures prominently in the opera Ainadamar (2003) by Osvaldo Golijov.

Honors
The Spanish airline, Iberia, has named one of its airplanes after the play and the person it was based on.

References

A parallel English-Spanish version with extensive notes has been prepared by Dr  Robert G Havard (Aris & Phillips 1987)

Sources
 Edwards, Gwynne. 1980. Lorca: The Theatre Beneath the Sand. London and New York: Marion Boyars. .

1927 plays
Plays by Federico García Lorca
Salvador Dalí